is a Chinese Japanese model, tarento, and gravure idol.

She is represented with the agency Idea and she has a business alliance with Hour Songs Creative from K-Dash.

Biography
She started in the modelling business from her high school days, and started full-fledged activities while entering university.

In the Wonder Festival on 8 February 2015 of 2015 Winter, she was introduced as a new member of the "Racing Mix Supporters 2015" and debuted as a race queen at the 1st Okayama International Circuit of the Super GT on 4 April. From 2 July she made regular appearances in Jisedai Idol Hakkutsu Variety: Ninki-sha ni narou! as a candidate for Nikkei Telegenic 2015, and was elected Nittelegenic 2015 on 10 September, and on 18 December she released the image DVD Ryuki's Color Time.

On 28 February 2016, she participated in the Tokyo Marathon.

On 19 March of the same year, she was elected as the Tokyo Girls Collection Official Running Team Tokyo Girls Run 5th grader, and on 25 March became a regular weather presenter on Pon! on Mondasy. As a member of the Tokyo Girls Run on 22 May she ran in the Karuizawa Half Marathon and finished in 2 hours and 6 minutes. She was selected as "2017 San Ai Swimsuit Image Girl" on 7 November.

Personal life
Kumae was born in China, where she spent her early childhood. She is fluent in Chinese and also teaches the language.

Works

Videos

Filmography

Television

Radio

Shows

Race queen

Events

Advertisements

Bibliography

Magazines

References

External links
 – Eyes 
 – Ameba Blog 
"Jisedai Idol Hakkutsu Variety: Ninki-sha ni narou!" 

Japanese female models
Japanese gravure models
Weather presenters
People from Sichuan
Naturalized citizens of Japan
Japanese people of Chinese descent
1995 births
Living people
Chinese female models
Chinese emigrants to Japan